Mirocin Górny  (formerly German Ober Herzogswaldau) is a village in the administrative district of Gmina Kożuchów, within Nowa Sól County, Lubusz Voivodeship, in western Poland. It was known by its former name Herzogswaldau while in the Kingdom of Prussia. The village has a population of 633.

References

Villages in Nowa Sól County